Fergus M. Bordewich (born November 1, 1947) is an American writer, popular historian, and editor living in San Francisco. He is the author of eight nonfiction books, including a memoir, and an illustrated children's book.

Biography
Bordewich was born in New York City in 1947, and grew up in Yonkers, New York. While growing up, he often traveled to Indian reservations around the United States with his mother, LaVerne Madigan Bordewich, the executive director of the Association on American Indian Affairs, then the only independent advocacy organization for Native Americans. This early experience helped to shape his lifelong preoccupation with American history, the settlement of the continent, and issues of race, and political power. He holds degrees from the City College of New York and Columbia University. In the late 1960s, he did voter registration for the NAACP in the still-segregated South; he also worked as a roustabout in Alaska's Arctic oil fields, a taxi driver in New York City, and a deckhand on a Norwegian freighter.

In 2015, he served as chairman of the awards committee for the Frederick Douglass Book Prize, given by the Gilder-Lehrman Center for the Study of Slavery, Resistance, and Abolition, at Yale University. He is a frequent public speaker at universities and other forums, as well as on radio and television. As a journalist, he has traveled extensively in Asia, the Middle East, Europe, and Africa, writing on politics, economic issues, culture, and history, on subjects ranging from the civil war in Burma, religious repression in China, Islamic fundamentalism, German reunification, the Irish economy, Kenya's population crisis, and many others. He also served for brief periods as an editor and writer for the Tehran Journal in Iran in 1972-1973, a press officer for the United Nations in 1980-1982, and an advisor to the New China News Agency in Beijing in 1982-1983, when that agency was embarking on its effort to switch from a propaganda model to a western-style journalistic one.
He is married to Jean Parvin Bordewich.

Writing career
Bordewich has been an independent historian and writer since the early 1970s. He is a frequent book reviewer for The Wall Street Journal and other popular and scholarly periodicals, mostly on subjects in 18th and 19th century American history. He  wrote the script for a PBS documentary about Thomas Jefferson, Mr. Jefferson's University.

Bound for Canaan was selected as one of the American Booksellers Association's "ten best nonfiction books" in 2005; as the Great Lakes Booksellers' Association's "best non-fiction book" of 2005; as one of the Austin Public Library's Best Non-Fiction books of 2005; and as one of the New York Public Library's "ten books to remember" in 2005.

Bordewich is a frequent book reviewer for The Wall Street Journal and other popular and scholarly periodicals, and speaks often at universities and other forums, as well as on radio and television, most often on subjects related to 18th and 19th century American history. His articles have appeared in The New York Times, The Wall Street Journal, American Heritage, The Atlantic, Harper's, New York Magazine, GEO, and Reader's Digest, amongst others.

Reviews
The First Congress, is a mainstream history of America’s first Congress. Bordewich Bordewich describes James Madison, Roger Sherman, Oliver Ellsworth, Elbridge Gerry, and Robert Morris through brief biographical sketches. "Bordewich’s noteworthy exploration of the foundation for a working constitutional government provides an important perspective on American history."

In 2013, America's Great Debate was highlighted at the National Festival of the Book, in Washington, D.C. It was named one of the Best Books of 2012 by The Washington Post. In his review, Post publisher Donald E. Graham called the book "original in concept, stylish in execution. [It] provides everything history readers want. Two things above all: a compelling story and a cast of characters who come convincingly to life."Kirkus Reviews called it a "Wholly enjoyable study of an earlier era of intense political partisanship...Bordewich portrays a colorful cast of characters—Democrats, Whigs, Free Soilers and abolitionists—whose passionate rhetoric attained lyrical heights and brought the debate about America’s very identity to the forefront."

Washington is a history of the byzantine politics behind the founding of the nation's capital and slaves who built it. Jonathan Yardley of The Washington Post wrote, "The role played by blacks in the early development of this country has been scanted for more than two centuries... and is only recently being placed in proper perspective. Bordewich makes an important contribution to that undertaking."

How Republican Reformers Fought The Civil War is a "sprawling story of legislative activism and ascendancy" of Radical Republicans after their southern colleagues left Congress. Andrew Ferguson, writing in The Atlantic wrote, "Yet in Bordewich’s telling, Lincoln had little to do with the ambitious measures, [the Homestead Act, the Pacific Railway Act, and the Morrill Land Grant College Act] as if the bills were signed by autopen during coffee breaks," despite the fact that the Homestead Act and the Railway Act were part of Lincoln's 1860 platform. "But misjudging Lincoln’s role as executive and his commitment to larger obligations is Bordewich’s more telling mistake."

Works

Non-fiction
 Congress at War: How Republican Reformers Fought The Civil War, Defied Lincoln, Ended Slavery, And Remade America (Penguin Random House, 2020)
 The First Congress: How James Madison, George Washington, and a Group of Extraordinary Men Invented the Government (Simon & Schuster, 2016)
 America's Great Debate: Henry Clay, Stephen A. Douglas, and the Compromise That Preserved the Union (Simon & Schuster, 2012)
 Washington: The Making of the American Capital (Amistad/HarperCollins, 2008)
 Bound for Canaan: The Underground Railroad and the War for the Soul of America (Amistad/HarperCollins, 2005)
 My Mother's Ghost, a memoir (Doubleday, 2001)
 Killing the White Man's Indian: Reinventing Native Americans at the End of the Twentieth Century (Doubleday, 1996)
 Cathay: A Journey in Search of Old China (Prentice Hall Press, 1991)

Children’s fiction
Peach Blossom Spring, Illustrator Ming-Yi Yang, Green Tiger Press, 1994,

As editor
Children of the Dragon

References

External links

 Author's website

Living people
21st-century American historians
21st-century American male writers

Historians of the United States
1947 births
City College of New York alumni
Columbia University alumni
American male non-fiction writers